Erik Benjamin Nygren (born 8 July 2001) is a Swedish professional footballer who plays as a right winger for Danish Superliga club FC Nordsjælland.

Club career

IFK Göteborg
Nygren started playing football in Utbynäs SK when he was 5–6 years old. At the age of 12 in 2013, he joined IFK Göteborg. After impressing on the youth teams, Nygren made his first-team debut for IFK Göteborg in a friendly game against Örgryte IS on 24 March 2018. Two months after his debut, in May 2018, Nygren signed his first professional contract with Göteborg - a deal until the end of 2020 - turning down foreign clubs such as Manchester City, Bayern Munich and Inter. The new contract also meant that 16-year old Nygren was promoted to the first team squad.

Nygren's official debut for Göteborg came against Torns IF in the Swedish Cup on 23 August 2018, when Benjamin Nygren made a brief appearance in the 4-0 win. Before the season ended, Nygren also made his Allsvenskan debut in a game against Djurgårdens IF on 31 October 2018 - and he ended up getting playing time in the last three games of the season. In the following match against Malmö FF, Nygren was given a chance from the start and he was also in the starting line-up in the final game of the season against Örebro SK, scoring twice in Göteborg's 3-1 victory.

Genk
On 20 June 2019, 17-year old Nygren joined Belgian club Genk in a record deal for a fee around five million euros. He signed a deal until June 2024. Nygren made his debut for Genk in a Belgian Super Cup win against K.V. Mechelen on 20 July 2019. Nygren also scored Genk's first goal in his home debut on 27 July in a 2-1 win over K.V. Kortrijk.

To get some more playing time and experience, Nygren was loaned out to Dutch side SC Heerenveen on 6 October 2020 for two seasons. In his first season, Nygren scored seven goals in 32 games (16 from start and 16 from the bench). Already after the first season, there was talk that he was on his way out of the club because he wasn't getting enough playing time, but he ended up staying and started the 2021-22 season out at the Dutch club.

Nordsjælland
On 30 January 2022, Nygren got his loan-spell at SC Heerenveen terminated and joined Danish Superliga club FC Nordsjælland on a deal until the end of 2025.

References

External links
 
 

2001 births
Living people
Association football wingers
Swedish footballers
Sweden under-21 international footballers
Sweden youth international footballers
Swedish expatriate footballers
IFK Göteborg players
K.R.C. Genk players
SC Heerenveen players
FC Nordsjælland players
Allsvenskan players
Belgian Pro League players
Eredivisie players
Expatriate footballers in Belgium
Expatriate footballers in the Netherlands
Expatriate men's footballers in Denmark
Swedish expatriate sportspeople in Belgium
Swedish expatriate sportspeople in the Netherlands
Swedish expatriate sportspeople in Denmark
Footballers from Gothenburg